Mahesh Rao (born 14 February 1982) is an Indian director, screenwriter and lyricist who works in Kannada films. He is known for the movies Dheemaku, Murali meets Meera (2011) and Bhadra (2011). His next movie is with Yash and Radhika Pandit which is in pre-production stage to be produced by K.Manju.

Early life and education
Mahesh Rao was born on 14 February 1982 at Bangalore. He studied in St.Josephs High School Bangalore & did his graduation at PES College Bangalore.
He was performing dramas since his school days. His friend Thilak introduced him to a theater performing dramas. He performed plays under Nataranga, Samudhaya, C.R.Simha's Vedike & Snehasamooha. In 2012 he married Kirthika, CO-producer of popular television serials Puttagowri Maduve & Akka.

Mahesh Rao started his career as an assistant director to acclaimed director K. M. Chaitanya for his T.V show Ee Prashne. He acted in veteran director Nagabharana's T.V serial Joku Joke. After this he assisted Sunil Kumar Singh for his serials Godhooli, Thulasi, Yava Janmada Maithri for 6 years along with acting in those serials too.

Film career
After his successful stint at television serials, Mahesh Rao made his debut through Dheemaku (2008), starring Naveen Krishna in the lead role. The movie got rave reviews from critics and was an average grosser at box office. In 2009 he collaborated with Milana fame director Prakash for the screenplay of Gokula. His second film, Murali Meets Meera, a romantic film based on a novel, was released in 2011, with Prajwal Devraj in the lead role. Murali Meets Meera too earned positive response from critics, with The Times of India and Bangalore Mirror rating it 4/5 and Sify rating it 3/5. The movie subsequently went on to become a sleeper hit after running for 50 days at the box office. Following the success of Murali Meets Meera, Mahesh Rao's next was Bhadra, a remake of the Telugu movie Ranam, and introduced Daisy Shah pairing with Prajwal Devraj. He made some changes to the screenplay to suit the nativity of the Kannada audience and the movie went on to become a super hit running 75 days at the box office with overall critics rating it as 3/5 and praising his direction skills. In 2013, he was roped in to direct Case No. 18/9, a remake of the Tamil hit Vazhakku enn 18/9. After its release, the film received generally positive reviews from critics. The performances of Niranjan Shetty, Sindhu Lokanath, Shwetha Pandit and Rangayana Raghu, and the film's direction, screenplay and narration received praise from critics. Case No. 18/9 was a profitable venture for the producers fetching 1.57 crores (US$230,000) only from satellite rights from Suvarna TV.  Then he went on to direct Endendu Ninagagi which was a remake of Engeyum Eppothum and was a box office failure even after receiving positive reviews from critics. His next movie was Kwatle Satisha which was again a remake of Naduvula Konjam Pakkatha Kaanom. Kwatle Satisha received positive reviews from critics and was a profitable venture for the producer. His next stint was as dialogue writer for the Ganesh starrer movie Khushi Khushiyagi released in 2015. Initially there were speculations that he would direct a movie starring Yash for the remake of Tamil movie Vaalu but eventually the remake idea was scrapped. Mahesh Rao wrote his own script and it was finalised by producer K.Manju. This film got the final title Santhu Straight Forward and will go on floors February 2016 starring Yash and Radhika Pandit.

Filmography

Television shows

References

1982 births
Living people
Kannada film directors
Kannada screenwriters
Indian male screenwriters
Indian television directors
Screenwriters from Bangalore
Film directors from Bangalore
21st-century Indian film directors
21st-century Indian dramatists and playwrights
21st-century Indian male writers
21st-century Indian screenwriters